Varmaqan (also Romanized as Varmaqān and Warmaqān; also known as Varmaghān, Varmakān, and Vazmakān) is a village in Bavaleh Rural District, in the Central District of Sonqor County, Kermanshah Province, Iran. At the 2006 census, its population was 216, in 44 families.

References 

Populated places in Sonqor County